This is a list of  Spanish words of Chinese origin.  Some of these words have alternate etymologies and may also appear on a list of Spanish words from a different language.

List 
 biombo = folding screen: from Portuguese biombo, from Japanese byōbu, from Chinese pingfeng (屏風), "folding screen," from ping "folding screen," + feng "wind."
 bonzo = Buddhist monk: from Portuguese bonzo, from Japanese bonsō, from Chinese fanseng (梵僧) "Buddhist monk," from fan (earlier also pronounced bón) "a Buddhist," from Sanskrit brāhmanas "Brahmin," from brahmán- "priest, prayer" + Chinese seng "monk." 
 cantón = cotton cloth: from Cantão, old Portuguese name for Guangzhou, alteration of Chinese Guang-dong (廣東), Kuang-tung, "region of the east," from guang "region" + dōng "east."    
 caolín = type of fine, white clay: from French kaolin/caolin, from Kaoling, name of a hill in southeast China where this clay was originally obtained, from Chinese Gaoling (高嶺), literally "high mountain," from gāo, "high," + ling, "mountain, summit." 
 charola = serving tray: from charol "glossy varnish," from Portuguese charão, from regional Chinese chat liao (漆料) "varnish," from chat, "varnish," + liao, "material, ingredient."
 china = an orange: shortened from naranja china, "Chinese orange," from Portuguese China, from Persian Cin (چین), derived from Sanskrit Cīna (चीन) (c. 1st century), probably from Chinese Qín (秦), Chinese dynasty (221-206 B.C.).  For the etymologically unrelated Spanish word china/chino, see here.
 chinero = cupboard: from porcelana de China, "Chinese porcelain."  see china above. 
 soja = the soybean plant, a soybean: from Dutch soja "soy sauce, soybean," from Chinese "su/Shu" 菽 thence to Japanese shōyu (醤油) "soy sauce," from Chinese 醬油 jiang-you), literally "oil sauce," or from Cantonese shî-yaū (豉油) from shî "fermented soybean" + yóu "oil, grease." 
 soya = the soybean plant, a soybean: from English soya "soybean," from Dutch soja, see soja above.  
 té = tea, tea plant, dried tea leaves: from Hokkien (Min Nan) t'e, "(茶) tea," from Old Chinese d'a, "tea," in the three meanings) described above.
 tifón = typhoon: from Cantonese taaî fung "typhoon," (颱風, 大風 influenced by Spanish Tifón from Greek mythology) literally "great wind," from taaî (Chinese dà) "great," + fung (Chinese fēng) "wind."

References 
 "Breve diccionario etimológico de la lengua española" by Guido Gómez de Silva

See also 
 Linguistic history of Spanish
 List of English words of Spanish origin

Chinesest
Spanish